Governors Island was an island in Boston Harbor in the U.S. state of Massachusetts. The island was subsumed by land reclamation for the construction and extension of Logan International Airport.

Governor's Island was originally owned by early Massachusetts founder Roger Conant, and known as Conant's Island.  Conant grew grapes there, and very likely his vineyard is what Rev. John White referred to "as good as any are found in France by human culture," with some being "four inches around."

Governor's Island was the site of Fort Winthrop, a defensive fortification named after Governor John Winthrop, whose family was granted the island in 1632 and owned it until 1808, when it was acquired for the construction of the fort.

The island is buried in the area north of the south end of runway 14/32.

References

Boston Harbor peninsulas and former islands
Logan International Airport
Former islands of Massachusetts